The Verses is the debut EP by Australian band The Verses. The band consists of Ella Hooper and Jesse Hooper among others, who were previously known as Killing Heidi.

Track listing
Australian EP
 "Everything at Once"
 "Waste of Time"
 "Forever More"
 "Holidays"

Singles
"Forever More" was sent to radio on 9 November 2009 as the lead single.

Charts

Release history

References

2009 EPs
The Verses albums